The Order of the Rue Crown or Order of the Crown of Saxony was a dynastic order of knighthood of the Kingdom of Saxony. The order takes its name from the green floral crown of rue (crancelin) found in the coat of arms of Saxony. It occupies the highest rank of the former Saxon honour system.

History
The order was created to be the civil counterpart to the Military Order of St. Henry, the only order previously at the disposal of the new king. It was established in 1807 by Frederick Augustus I, the first King of Saxony. The order was originally limited to 24 knights, but exceptions were made for members of ruling houses and those whose membership in the order would add to its prestige.

The Order of the Rue Crown was presented in a single grade, Knight. Twice, the order was granted in a special grade with diamonds, to Portuguese Prime Minister Dom Nuno José de Moura Barreto, Duke of Loulé in 1859 and Chancellor Otto von Bismarck in 1885. From its founding to the fall of the Kingdom of Saxony in 1918, the order was presented 332 times.

Appearance
The badge of the order is a gold Maltese cross, enameled in green with a white border.  The white center medallion features the crowned monogram of Frederick Augustus I of Saxony, encircled by a green crown of rue. Between the arms of the cross is a golden crown of rue.  

The star of the order is made of silver, and has eight points. The center of the star bears a gold medallion with the motto of the order, PROVIDENTIÆ MEMOR, inside a ring of green rue leaves.

The badge of the order is borne on a riband of grass green, worn over the right shoulder.

Knights 

 Prince Adalbert of Prussia (1884–1948)
 Adolphe, Grand Duke of Luxembourg
 Albert I of Belgium
 Prince Albert of Prussia (1809–1872)
 Prince Albert of Saxe-Altenburg
 Albert of Saxony
 Archduke Albrecht, Duke of Teschen
 Albert, Prince Consort
 Prince Albert of Prussia (1837–1906)
 Albert, Prince of Schwarzburg-Rudolstadt
 Alexander II of Russia
 Alexander III of Russia
 Prince Alexander of Hesse and by Rhine
 Alexander, Margrave of Meissen
 Alfonso XIII
 Alfred, 2nd Prince of Montenuovo
 Alexander Cambridge, 1st Earl of Athlone
 Prince August of Saxe-Coburg and Gotha
 Maximilian de Beauharnais, 3rd Duke of Leuchtenberg
 Bernhard II, Duke of Saxe-Meiningen
 Prince Bernhard of Saxe-Weimar-Eisenach (1792–1862)
 Jérôme Bonaparte
 Walther Bronsart von Schellendorff
 Bernhard von Bülow
 Karl von Bülow
 Carl, 3rd Prince of Leiningen
 Infante Carlos María Isidro of Spain
 Charles I of Austria
 Charles I of Württemberg
 Charles X
 Charles XIV John
 Charles Alexander, Grand Duke of Saxe-Weimar-Eisenach
 Charles Augustus, Hereditary Grand Duke of Saxe-Weimar-Eisenach (1844–1894)
 Charles Edward, Duke of Saxe-Coburg and Gotha
 Prince Charles of Prussia
 Chlodwig, Prince of Hohenlohe-Schillingsfürst
 Christian IX of Denmark
 Prince Christian of Schleswig-Holstein
 Constantine I of Greece
 Prince Eduard of Saxe-Altenburg
 Edward VII
 Prince Eitel Friedrich of Prussia
 Ernest I, Duke of Saxe-Coburg and Gotha
 Ernest II, Duke of Saxe-Coburg and Gotha
 Prince Ernest Augustus, 3rd Duke of Cumberland and Teviotdale
 Ernest Louis, Grand Duke of Hesse
 Ernst I, Duke of Saxe-Altenburg
 Ernst Gunther, Duke of Schleswig-Holstein
 Prince Ernst Heinrich of Saxony
 Ernst II, Duke of Saxe-Altenburg
 Ferdinand I of Austria
 Ferdinand II of Portugal
 Ferdinand III, Grand Duke of Tuscany
 Ferdinand IV, Grand Duke of Tuscany
 Archduke Ferdinand Karl of Austria
 Prince Ferdinand of Bavaria
 Emanuele Filiberto, 2nd Duke of Aosta
 Francis II of the Two Sicilies
 Francisco de Asís, Duke of Cádiz
 Archduke Franz Ferdinand of Austria
 Franz Joseph I of Austria
 Archduke Franz Karl of Austria
 Prince Franz of Bavaria
 Frederick Augustus II, Grand Duke of Oldenburg
 Frederick Augustus II of Saxony
 Frederick Augustus III of Saxony
 Frederick Francis II, Grand Duke of Mecklenburg-Schwerin
 Frederick Francis III, Grand Duke of Mecklenburg-Schwerin
 Frederick I, Duke of Anhalt
 Frederick I, Grand Duke of Baden
 Frederick III, German Emperor
 Prince Frederick of Württemberg
 Frederick William III of Prussia
 Frederick William, Grand Duke of Mecklenburg-Strelitz
 Frederick, Duke of Saxe-Altenburg
 Friedrich Christian, Margrave of Meissen
 Prince Friedrich Karl of Prussia (1828–1885)
 Prince Friedrich Leopold of Prussia
 Archduke Friedrich, Duke of Teschen
 Georg II, Duke of Saxe-Meiningen
 Georg, Crown Prince of Saxony
 Georg, Duke of Saxe-Altenburg
 George V of Hanover
 George V
 George, King of Saxony
 Gustaf V
 Gustaf VI Adolf
 Gustav, Prince of Vasa
 Max von Hausen
 Prince Henry of Prussia (1862–1929)
 Heinrich VII, Prince Reuss of Köstritz
 Prince Hermann of Saxe-Weimar-Eisenach (1825–1901)
 Paul von Hindenburg
 Prince Joachim of Prussia
 Archduke John of Austria
 Prince Johann Georg of Saxony
 Johannes, 11th Prince of Thurn and Taxis
 John of Saxony
 Duke John Albert of Mecklenburg
 Joseph, Duke of Saxe-Altenburg
 Karl Anton, Prince of Hohenzollern
 Karl, Duke of Schleswig-Holstein-Sonderburg-Glücksburg
 Archduke Karl Salvator of Austria
 Prince Karl Theodor of Bavaria
 Karl Theodor, Duke in Bavaria
 Grand Duke Kirill Vladimirovich of Russia
 Hans von Koester
 Grand Duke Konstantin Pavlovich of Russia
 Konstantin of Hohenlohe-Schillingsfürst
 Leopold I of Belgium
 Leopold II of Belgium
 Leopold IV, Duke of Anhalt
 Archduke Leopold Ferdinand of Austria
 Leopold II, Grand Duke of Tuscany
 Prince Leopold of Bavaria
 Louis III, Grand Duke of Hesse
 Louis IV, Grand Duke of Hesse
 Louis Antoine, Duke of Angoulême
 Ludwig I of Bavaria
 Ludwig II of Bavaria
 Ludwig III of Bavaria
 Archduke Ludwig Viktor of Austria
 Luís I of Portugal
 Luitpold, Prince Regent of Bavaria
 Maria Emanuel, Margrave of Meissen
 Prince Maximilian of Baden
 Maximilian, Hereditary Prince of Saxony
 Prince Maximilian of Saxony (1870–1951)
 Klemens von Metternich
 Grand Duke Michael Nikolaevich of Russia
 Milan I of Serbia
 Helmuth von Moltke the Elder
 Prince Moritz of Saxe-Altenburg
 Napoleon III
 Napoléon, Prince Imperial
 Nicholas Alexandrovich, Tsesarevich of Russia
 Oscar II
 Archduke Otto of Austria (1865–1906)
 Otto of Greece
 Duke Paul Frederick of Mecklenburg
 Pedro II of Brazil
 Pedro V of Portugal
 Peter II, Grand Duke of Oldenburg
 Prince Philipp of Saxe-Coburg and Gotha
 Duke Philipp of Württemberg
 Prince Philippe, Count of Flanders
 Hans von Plessen
 Joseph Radetzky von Radetz
 Archduke Rainer Ferdinand of Austria
 Duke Robert of Württemberg
 Albrecht von Roon
 Rudolf, Prince of Liechtenstein
 Rudolf, Crown Prince of Austria
 Prince Thomas, Duke of Genoa
 Umberto I of Italy
 Victor Emmanuel II of Italy
 Victor Emmanuel III of Italy
 Prince Waldemar of Prussia (1889–1945)
 Alfred von Waldersee
 Arthur Wellesley, 1st Duke of Wellington
 Wilhelm II, German Emperor
 Wilhelm Karl, Duke of Urach
 William I of Württemberg
 William I, German Emperor
 William II of Württemberg
 William III of the Netherlands
 William Ernest, Grand Duke of Saxe-Weimar-Eisenach
 Prince William of Baden (1829–1897)
 William, Prince of Hohenzollern
 Ferdinand von Zeppelin

References

Rue Crown
Awards established in 1807
Dynastic orders
Kingdom of Saxony